Joel Parker may refer to:

Joel Parker (American football) (b. 1952), American football player
Joel Parker (clergyman) (1799–1873), American Presbyterian clergyman
Joel Parker (jurist) (1795–1875), American jurist from New Hampshire
Joel Parker (politician) (1816–1888), American politician for the Democratic Party